Buenos Ayres is a town in Trinidad and Tobago.  It is located in southwestern Trinidad, north of Erin and southeast of Point Fortin.  Buenos Ayres is the hometown of the calypsonian Cro Cro.  The Erin Savannas, one of the last remaining natural savannas in Trinidad and Tobago is located just east of Buenos Ayres.

Climate 
Area has a relatively rare tropical monsoon climate,  occasionally also known as a tropical wet climate or tropical monsoon and trade-wind littoral climate.  The Köppen Climate Classification subtype for this climate is "Am" (tropical monsoon climate).

References

Populated places in Trinidad and Tobago